An equestrian statue of Juan de Oñate formerly stood in Alcalde, New Mexico, in the United States. The monument was removed in June 2020 amid the George Floyd protests. It was situated outside the Northern Rio Grande National Heritage Center (until 2017 the Oñate Monument and Visitor Center) in Alcalde, New Mexico from 1994 to 2020.

Description and history
The  statue was cast in bronze by Reynaldo Rivera. It was erected in 1994. The right foot of the statue was cut off on December 29, 1997, shortly before commemorations for the 400th anniversary, in 1998, of Oñate's arrival in New Mexico. A note was left at the scene that said "Fair is fair." The foot was recast, but a seam where the two pieces joined was still visible. Some commentators suggested leaving the statue maimed as a symbolic reminder of the foot-amputating Acoma Massacre. A local filmmaker, Chris Eyre, was contacted by one of the two perpetrators, who said, "I'm back on the scene to show people that Oñate and his supporters must be shamed." The sculptor responded that chopping feet "was the nature of discipline of 400 years ago".

In 2017 the statue's left foot was painted red, and the words "Remember 1680" (year of the Pueblo revolt) were written with paint on the monument's base.

The county of Rio Arriba removed the statue on June 15, 2020.

See also
 Statue of Juan de Oñate (Albuquerque, New Mexico) – another statue of Oñate removed in June 2020
 List of monuments and memorials removed during the George Floyd protests

References

1994 establishments in New Mexico
1994 sculptures
2020 disestablishments in New Mexico
Buildings and structures in Rio Arriba County, New Mexico
Equestrian statues in the United States
Monuments and memorials in New Mexico
Monuments and memorials removed during the George Floyd protests
Outdoor sculptures in New Mexico
Sculptures of men in the United States
Vandalized works of art in New Mexico
Statues removed in 2020